Alexander Brailowsky (16 February 1896 – 25 April 1976) was a Russian-born French pianist who specialised in the works of Frédéric Chopin. He was a leading concert pianist in the years between the two World Wars.

Early life
Brailowsky was born in Kiev, then part of the Russian Empire, to a Jewish family, and as a boy, he studied piano with his father, a professional pianist. When he was 8, he studied in Kiev with Vladimir Puchalsky, a pupil of Theodor Leschetizky. At the age of 18, he attended Kiev Conservatory, graduating with a gold medal in 1911. He went on to study with Leschetizky in Vienna until 1914, then with Ferruccio Busoni in Zürich, and finally with Francis Planté in Paris. He became a French citizen in 1926.

Career
Brailowsky made his concert debut in Paris in 1919.

Brailowsky programmed all 160 piano pieces by Frédéric Chopin for playing in a series of six concerts. In 1924, he gave a recital in Paris of the complete cycle of the works of Chopin, the first in history, using the composer's own piano for part of the recital. He then went on to present a further thirty cycles of Chopin's music in Paris, Brussels, Zurich, Mexico City, Buenos Aires and Montevideo. A highly successful world tour followed. Brailowsky's American debut was at Aeolian Hall in New York City in 1924.

He toured the United States in 1936. During a series of nineteen recitals in Buenos Aires, he never repeated a single work.

During World War II, he gave recitals for the USO. In 1960, he played the Chopin cycle again in Paris, and in Brussels in honor of the 150th anniversary of Chopin's birth.

Between 1925 and 1930 he recorded at least twenty three works for the Ampico reproducing pianos, preserving his earliest recorded legacy in this medium.

Brailowsky's first audio recordings were produced in Berlin from 1928 to 1934 and released on 78 rpm discs. In 1938, he recorded in London for HMV. Later discs were produced for RCA Victor and, in the 1960s, for CBS. Besides his huge output of Chopin, his repertoire also included Rachmaninoff, Saint-Saëns, Liszt, Debussy and others.

Death
Brailowsky died in New York City at the age of 80 from complications brought on by pneumonia and was survived by his wife Felicia Brailowsky. He and his wife are buried on the Mount Judah Cemetery in  Ridgewood, Queens.

Technique
Brailowsky said that the technique used to play Chopin's music should be "fluent, fluid, delicate, airy, and capable of great variety of color."

Selected recordings
 Chopin: The Fourteen Waltzes (Columbia MS-6228)
 Chopin: The Complete Mazurkas Vol. 1 (Columbia)
 Chopin: The Complete Mazurkas Vol. 2 (Columbia)
 A Chopin Recital (Columbia MS-6569)
 Chopin Nocturnes Vol. 1 
 Chopin Nocturnes Vol. 2 
 Chopin Polonaises (Columbia)
 Chopin: The 24 Preludes (Columbia MS-6119)
 Chopin: Concerto No. 1 in E Minor. Op. 11 
 Chopin: The Complete Etudes (RCA)
 Chopin Concerto No. 1, Liszt: Todtentanz (Columbia)
 Brailowsky Plays Liszt (RCA LM1772)
 Liszt: 15 Hungarian Rhapsodies 
 Rachmaninoff Piano Concerto No. 2 (RCA)
 Schumann: Etudes Symphoniques (RCA)
 Chopin: Sonata in B Minor Op. 58 (HMV DB 3701)
 Chopin: Waltzes (Volume 1) *Op. 18 *Op. 34, Nos. 1, 2 and 3 *Op. 42 *Op. 64, Nos. 1, 2 and 3 (Victor Red Seal Records M863)

References

External links

  *[ All Music]
Interview with Felicia Karzmar Brailowsky, ca. 1982

1896 births
1976 deaths
20th-century French male classical pianists
Jewish classical pianists
Ukrainian classical pianists
Ukrainian Jews
Soviet emigrants to France
Musicians from Kyiv
Pupils of Theodor Leschetizky
Russian classical pianists
Russian pianists
Russian Jews
Russian classical musicians